Like all municipalities of Puerto Rico, Río Grande is subdivided into administrative units called barrios, which are roughly comparable to minor civil divisions. The barrios and subbarrios, in turn, are further subdivided into smaller local populated place areas/units called sectores (sectors in English). The types of sectores may vary, from normally sector to urbanización to reparto to barriada to residencial, among others.

List of sectors by barrio

Ciénaga Alta
	Camino Mayagüeces
	Comunidad Campo Alegre
	Parcelas Malpica
	Urbanización Luzbella

Ciénaga Baja

	Apartamentos Miradores del Yunque
	Camino Los Rivera
	Carretera 959
	Comunidad Casiano Cepeda
	Condominio Portales de Río Grande
	Condominio Portales del Yunque
	Condominio Río Grande for The Elderly
	Égida Río Dorado Elderly (Sampayo Inc.)
	Extensióm Estancias del Sol
	Parcelas Estancias del Sol
	Parcelas La Ponderosa
	Parcelas Las Dolores
	Parcelas Monte Bello
	Residencal Galateo
	Río Grande Hills
	Sector El Hoyo
   Sector Las Flores Interior
	Sector Las Flores
	Sector Monte Flores
	Urbanización Alturas de Río Grande
	Urbanización Jardines de Río Grande
	Urbanización Montecillo
	Urbanización Pedregales
	Urbanización Proyecto Casa Verde
	Urbanización Proyecto Finca Galateo
	Urbanización Villas de Cambalache I y II 
	Urbanización Villas de Río Grande
	Urbanización Vistas de Río Grande I y II

Guzmán Abajo
	Apartamentos Lomas de Río Grande
	Comunidad Bartolo (Sosa)
	Comunidad Medero
	Río Grande Elderly Apartments
	Sector Báez
	Sector La Vega de Guzmán
	Sector Los Quianes
	Sector Márquez
	Sector Serra
	Sector Vista Azul
	Urbanización Jardines de Villa Paola
	Urbanización Miramelinda
	Urbanización Riveras de Río Grande
	Urbanización Vistas del Mar

Guzmán Arriba
	Comunidad Piza
	Sector El Rayo
	Sector Medina
	Sector Morovis

Herreras
	Apartamentos 7000 Bahía Beach Boulevard
	Apartamentos Grand Bay
	Apartamentos Las Olas
	Apartamentos Las Ventanas
	Berwind Beach Resort
	Comunidad P. H. Hernández (Hong Kong)
	Condominio Las Verandas
	Apartments Ocean Drive Beachfront Residence
	Urbanización Las Estancias

Jiménez
	Colinas Verdes
	Comunidad Burgos
	Comunidad Los Agosto
	Comunidad Quintas del Verde
	Comunidad Villa Calzada
	Égida Hogar de Mi Mamá 
	Égida Hogar Flor de la Esperanza
	Estancias del Verde
	Hacienda Jiménez
	Hacienda la Ceiba
	Hacienda Las Garzas
	Hogar Villa Paraíso
	Mansiones Hacienda Jiménez
	Parcelas Bella Vista
	Parcelas Samuel Dávila 
	Rincón Perfecto
	Sector Bella Vista
	Sector Blasina
	Sector Cara del Indio
	Sector El Peñón
	Sector El Verde
	Sector Estancias del Rey
	Sector Galateo
	Sector Juan González
	Sector Muñiz y Muñiz
	Sector Rivera
	Sector Rosales
	Sector Vega Alegre
	Urbanización Brisas del Verde
	Urbanización Catalina
	Urbanización El Verde Country Club
	Urbanización Los Árboles
	Urbanización Praderas del Yunque
	Urbanización Villa del Río
	Urbanización Villas de Viczay I y II

Mameyes II
	Apartamentos Beacon Hills Terrace
	Apartamentos Río Mar
	Apartamentos Villa Las Brisas
	Área Forestal del Yunque
	Barcelona
	Condominio Ocean Sixteen
	Condominio Villas del Carmen
	Florida
	Hill Side Village
	La Vega
	Parcelas Figueroa Nuevas
	Playa del Yunque
	Río Mar Village
	Sector Palmer
	Urbanización Beacon Hills Estates
	Urbanización Colina
	Urbanización Colinas del Yunque
	Urbanización Las Vistas de Río Mar
	Urbanización Río Mar

Río Grande barrio-pueblo

	Urbanización Del Carmen
	Urbanización Los Maestros
	Urbanización Villas de Río Grande
	Urbanización y Residencial José H. Ramírez

Zarzal
	Apartamentos Bosque del Mar
	Apartamentos Costa Dorada
	Apartamentos Las Casas at Coco Beach
	Apartamentos Las Vistas de Río Mar
	Apartamentos Lindo Mar II
	Apartamentos Lindo Mar
	Apartamentos Vista de Yunque Mar
	Apartments Río Grande Estates
	Camino Guilin
	Camino Los González
	Casa del Mar Resort
	Comunidad Villas Realidad
	Continental Beach Resort
	Costa Real
	Égida Jardín del Yunque
	Hacienda Jordán
	Hogar Sánchez Cintrón del Este
	Parcelas Carola
   Parcelas Figueroa
	Sector Carola
	Sector Corea
	Sector Cuchilla
	Sector Culebro
	Sector Jericó
	Sector La Victoria
	Sector Las Coles
	Sector Las Tres T
	Sector Los Castro
	Sector Los Paganes
	Sector Los Rodríguez
	Sector Los Rosales
	Sector Mabí
	Sector Matibulen
	Sector Punta Arena
	Sector Punta Picúa
	Sector Vietnam
	Urbanización Colinas Las Tres
   Urbanización Costa del Sol
	Urbanización Estancias del Madrigal
	Urbanización Lindo Mar I
	Urbanización Mirador de Palmer
	Urbanización Río Grande Estates
	Urbanización Villa del Mar (Coco Beach) 
	Urbanización Villas del Rey 
	Urbanización Vistas de Río Mar
	Vereda del Mar 
	Yunque del Mar Resort

See also

 List of communities in Puerto Rico

References

Río Grande
Río Grande